Morocco competed at the 1992 Summer Olympics in Barcelona, Spain.

Medalists

Competitors
The following is the list of number of competitors in the Games.

Results by event

Athletics
Men's 5.000 metres
Brahim Boutayeb
 Heat — 13:37.27
 Final — 13:13.27 (→ 4th place)

Mohamed Issangar
 Heat — 13:22.98
 Final — 13:28.97 (→ 9th place)

Men's 10.000 metres
Khalid Skah
 Heat — 28:18.48
 Final — 27:46.70 (→  Gold Medal)

Hammou Boutayeb
 Heat — 28:25.73
 Final — DNF (→ no ranking)

Men's 4 × 400 m Relay
Abdelali Kasbane, Abdelghani Gouriguer, Bouchaib Belkaid, and Benyounes Lahlou   
 Heat — 3:02.28 (→ did not advance)

Men's Marathon
 Salah Kokaich — 2:14.25 (→ 6th place)

Women's 400m Hurdles
Nouzha Bidiouane
 Heat — 55.95
 Semifinal — 55.08 (→ did not advance)

Boxing
Men's Light Flyweight (– 48 kg)
Mohamed Zbir
 First Round — Lost to Jan Quast (GER), 0:6

Men's Flyweight (– 51 kg)
Hamid Berhili

Men's Bantamweight (– 54 kg)
Mohammed Achik

Men's Lightweight (– 60 kg)
Kamal Marjouane

Men's Welterweight (– 67 kg)
Abdellah Taouane

Men's Light Middleweight (– 71 kg)
Mohamed Mesbahi

Men's Super Heavyweight (+ 91 kg)
Ahmed Sarir

Football

Men's team competition
 Preliminary round (group C)
 Drew with South Korea (1-1)
 Lost to Sweden (0-4)
 Lost to Paraguay (1-3) → Did not advance

 Team roster
 ( 1) Mustapha Achab
 ( 2) Rachid Azzouzi
 ( 3) Abdelkrim El Hadrioui
 ( 4) Mouloud Moudakkar
 ( 5) Mouhcine Bouhlal
 ( 6) Noureddine Naybet 
 ( 7) Khalid Raghib
 ( 8) Hicham Dmiai
 ( 9) Mohamed El Badraoui
 (10) Said Rokbi
 (11) Mohamed Aziz Samadi
 (12) Aziz Azim
 (13) Rachid Iddaoudi
 (14) Lahcen Abrami
 (15) Abdel Majid Karaouane
 (16) Brahim Bougrine
 (17) Youssef Chippo
 (18) Lahoussaine Ahnouta
 (19) Ahmed Bahja
 (20) Mohamed Ibari Mansouri
Head coach: Werner Olk

References

Sources
Official Olympic Reports
International Olympic Committee results database

Nations at the 1992 Summer Olympics
1992
Summer Olympics